The 2021 Festival Luxembourgeois du cyclisme féminin Elsy Jacobs (known as the Ceratizit Festival Elsy Jacobs for sponsorship reasons) was a women's road cycling stage race that was held in Luxembourg from 30 April to 2 May 2021. It was the 13th edition of the Festival Elsy Jacobs and the first as a category 2.Pro event in the UCI Women's ProSeries after its promotion after the 2019 season and the cancellation of the 2020 edition of the race.

Teams 
Eight of the nine UCI Women's WorldTeams and ten UCI Women's Continental Teams made up the eighteen teams that participated the race. Each team entered a full squad of six riders, but two  riders had to pull out prior to the start of the race. This left 106 riders who started the race, of which 67 finished.

UCI Women's WorldTeams

 
 
 
 
 
 
 
 

UCI Women's Continental Teams

Route

Stages

Prologue 
30 April 2021 — Cessange to Cessange,  (ITT)

Stage 1 
1 May 2021 — Steinfort to Steinfort,

Stage 2 
2 May 2021 — Garnich to Garnich,

Classification leadership table 

 On stage 2, Leah Kirchmann, who was second in the points classification, wore the green jersey, because first placed Lorena Wiebes wore the yellow jersey as the leader of the general classification. For the same reason, Karlijn Swinkels, who was second in the young rider classification, wore the white jersey. 
 On stage 3, Kirchmann and Swinkels continued to wear their respective jerseys, but with Emma Norsgaard Jørgensen as the leader of the general classification.

Final classification standings

General classification

Points classification

Mountains classification

Young rider classification

Team classification

See also 
 2021 in women's road cycling

References

Sources

External links 
 

Festival Elsy Jacobs
Festival Elsy Jacobs

Festival Elsy Jacobs 
Festival Elsy Jacobs 
Festival Elsy Jacobs
Festival Elsy Jacobs